Endodonta apiculata is a species of small air-breathing land snail, a terrestrial pulmonate gastropod mollusc in the family Endodontidae, an endemic family of land snails from the Hawaiian islands.

Conservation status
This species is critically endangered and may perhaps already be extinct, mainly because of habitat loss due to human development.

Distribution
It is (or was) found only in Kauai, Hawaii, United States.

References

Endodontidae
Gastropods described in 1889
Taxa named by César Marie Félix Ancey
Taxonomy articles created by Polbot